Islam is a minority faith in Wales followed by 2.2 % of its population with about 64,000 adherents recorded as per 2021 Census up from about 46,000 adherents in the 2011 Census. The earliest recorded connections between Wales and the Muslim world dates back to the early 12th Century. There has been a Somali and Yemeni Islamic community in Cardiff since the mid-19th century, founded by seafarers to Cardiff Docks. The first purpose-built mosque was erected in Cardiff in 1947.

Today, Wales has about 40 mosques, most of which are in Cardiff, with others in Aberystwyth, Bangor, Barry, Haverfordwest, Lampeter, Neath, Newport, Port Talbot, Swansea and Wrexham.

2001 -  present  
New Muslim Network Wales was established in the later part of 2001 to provide support and advice to converts to Islam and their non-Muslim family. The group also provides advice to mosques and other Islamic organisations on dawah work and community relations.

In 2003, the Muslim Council of Wales was established with affiliates across Wales to represent the Muslim community in the public sphere.

The first university in the UK to be awarded by FOSIS (Federation of Students Islamic Societies, UK & Éire) for the best mosque facility on campus was a Welsh University – Swansea, which received the accolade in 2007.

In 2006, the first scout group for Muslims was launched in Cardiff with over 100 members.

In 2008, plans were announced to build an Islamic Centre in Carmarthen. A college for training Muslim clerics has been established in Llanybydder in Carmarthenshire.

In the 2010s , the Ahmadiyya Muslim Community has announced plans to construct the first Ahmadi mosque in Wales.

See also
 Islam in England
 Islam in Scotland
 Islam in Ireland
 Muslim Council of Britain
 Religion in Wales

References

External links
 IslamWales.com - Wales Premium Muslim Community Portal
 Swansea Mosque & Islamic Community Centre
 Swansea's New Mosque Project
 New Muslim Network Wales
 West Wales Islamic Cultural Association
 Muslim Council of Wales
 Muslims for Plaid
 North Wales Islamic Societies